Haara al-Wizarat, or Hayy al-Wizarat, better known as Hara, is a subject of the Baladiyah al-Malaz and a low-income residential neighborhood in Riyadh, Saudi Arabia. It shares borders with the ad-Dhubbat neighborhood to the east and as-Sulaimaniyah neighborhood to the northwest and hosts some of the government ministries, most notably the Ministry of Defense. The neighborhood is inhabited overwhelmingly by overseas workers from India and Bangladesh.

References 

Neighbourhoods in Riyadh